Acanthognathus teledectus is a species of ant belonging to the genus Acanthognathus. Described in 1969 by Brown & Kempf, the species is native to Central America.

References

Myrmicinae
Hymenoptera of South America
Insects described in 1969